Soltaniyeh County is in Zanjan province, Iran. The capital of the county is the city of Soltaniyeh. At the 2006 census, the region's population (as Soltaniyeh District of Abhar County) was 28,266 in 7,282 households. The following census in 2011 counted 28,592 people in 8,395 households. At the 2016 census, the  population was 29,480 in 9,130 households, by which time the district had been separated from the county to form Soltaniyeh County. There is a large cave called Katale Khor near the capital city.

Administrative divisions

The population history and structural changes of Soltaniyeh County's administrative divisions over three consecutive censuses are shown in the following table. The latest census shows two districts, four rural districts, and one city.

References

 

Counties of Zanjan Province